Jordan North is one of the 19 constituencies in the Yau Tsim Mong District of Hong Kong which was created in 2015.

The constituency loosely covers Jordan Road with the estimated population of 13,558.

Councillors represented

Election results

2010s

References

Constituencies of Hong Kong
Constituencies of Yau Tsim Mong District Council
2015 establishments in Hong Kong
Constituencies established in 2015
Yau Ma Tei